Evil Weed is a 2009 horror film written and directed by David Wexler.  It was filmed for an extremely low budget of $30,000 over five days in Montauk, New York, as a tip of the hat to the old B-Movies of the sixties and seventies.

The film was picked up for digital distribution by Film Buff (Cinetic Rights Management) in 2010.

Plot
Emily and her sister Danielle play host to friends at their parents' country house in the Hamptons.  The weekend is poised for success.  Murph, Emily's boyfriend, has chosen this occasion to propose, their respective best friends seem to be hitting it off, and Danielle's alienated boyfriend scores in the clutch by supplying the drugs.  But when his bag of unicorn weed livens up the party, some of the group begin to suffer from a weird reaction.  Inexplicable violence abruptly brings down their high.

Cast

External links
 
 
 Alan Smithee. "The One-Minute Verdict: finding the Next Paranormal Activity in Evil Weed". Movie Line. Retrieved October 30, 2009.

2009 horror films
2009 films
American horror films
Films shot in New York (state)
2000s English-language films
2000s American films